The 2001 Culligan Holiday Bowl was a college football bowl game played December 28, 2001, in San Diego, California. It was part of the 2001 NCAA Division I-A football season. It featured the Washington Huskies against the Texas Longhorns. Texas won 47–43 (a combined 90 points despite neither team scoring at all in the 1st quarter) after a dramatic comeback in the 4th quarter, scoring the winning touchdown with 38 seconds left. Earlier, Washington had led by as much as 19 points, and carried a 36–20 lead into the 4th quarter.

Scoring summary
Scoring Summary:
Washington - 43 yard field goal by John Anderson; 9 plays, 54 yards in 3:04, 13:06 remaining 
Washington - 43 yard field goal by John Anderson; 4 plays, 0 yards in 0:24, 12:30 remaining 
Washington - 38 yard interception return by Tank Johnson (Anderson kick); 6:54 remaining
Texas - 43 yard touchdown pass from Major Applewhite to B.J. Johnson (Dusty Mangum kick); 4 plays, 80 yards in 1:31, 5:23 remaining
Texas - 25 yard touchdown pass from Applewhite to Roy Williams (Mangum kick); 8 plays, 54 yards in 2:33, 1:55 remaining
Washington - 4 yard touchdown pass from Cody Pickett to Joe Collier (Anderson kick); 8 plays, 76 yards in 1:08, :47 remaining
Washington - 40 yard field goal by Anderson; 5 plays, 18 yards in 0:33, 0:00 remaining
Washington - 17 yard touchdown pass from Pickett to Jerramy Stevens (Anderson kick); 12 plays, 91 yards in 5:15, 7:46 remaining
Texas - Mangum 26 yard field goal; 8 plays, 66 yards in 2:09, 5:37 remaining
Washington - Willie Hurst 4 yard touchdown run (conversion pass intercepted); 6 plays, 65 yards in 1:46, 3:51 remaining
Texas - Mangum 24 yard field goal; 9 plays, 57 yards in 2:33, 1:18 remaining
Texas - Matt Trissel 2 yard touchdown pass from Applewhite (Applewhite pass failed); 10 plays, 48 yards in 2:51, 11:54 remaining
Texas - Ivan Williams 1 yard touchdown run (Mangum kick); 5 plays, 54 yards in 2:05, 8:01 remaining
Texas - Bo Scaife 4 yard touchdown pass from Applewhite (Mangum kick); 3 plays, 9 yards in 0:57, 6:00 remaining
Washington - Hurst 34 yard touchdown run (Anderson kick); 7 plays, 80 yards in 1:38, 1:49 remaining
Texas - Ivan Williams 3 yard touchdown run (Mangum kick); 7 plays, 80 yards in 1:11, :38 seconds remaining.

References

Holiday Bowl
Holiday Bowl
Texas Longhorns football bowl games
Washington Huskies football bowl games
Holiday Bowl
December 2001 sports events in the United States